Sheikh District is a district in the Sahil region of Somaliland. Its capital lies at Sheikh. The district was part of Togdheer region until 1998, when the Sheikh District was incorporated into the Sahil region.

Overview
Sheikh District is inhabited by the Issa Musse sub-clan of the Habr Awal as well as the Musa Abdallah branch of the  Habr Yunis sub-clan of the Garhajis. 

As with many other areas in the Somaliland interior, Sheikh is noted for its numerous historical structures and mountainous scenery.

See also
Administrative divisions of Somaliland
Regions of Somaliland
Districts of Somaliland

References

External links 
Districts of Somalia
Administrative Map of Sheikh District
Sheikh Town 

Districts of Somaliland
Sahil, Somaliland